TOCA World Touring Cars is a 2000 racing video game developed by Codemasters and published by Codemasters for PlayStation and Game Boy Advance. It is the third game in the TOCA series.

TOCA World Touring Cars features various Touring Car championships from around the world, but despite carrying the TOCA name, a fully licensed British Touring Car Championship (TOCA) series was not included. This upset a lot of fans of the series, but success continued. The gameplay overall became more "Arcade" and the replacement of qualifying laps with random grid positions together with the omission of penalties for bad driving made the game much more playable for the casual gamer. Curiously, unlike the first two titles in the TOCA series, World Touring Cars was not released in a Microsoft Windows version.

For the North American market, the game was released as Jarrett & Labonte Stock Car Racing, with the cover art featuring NASCAR drivers Jason Jarrett and Justin Labonte.

Reception

The game received "favourable" reviews according to the review aggregation website Metacritic. In Japan, where the PlayStation version was ported and published by Spike under the name  on 9 November 2000, Famitsu gave it a score of 27 out of 40.

The PS version was a bestseller in the UK, replacing WWF SmackDown!. In the media, once again the franchise was compared to the Gran Turismo series and TOCA was warmly received by much of the specialist press, most notably scoring 10 out of 10 in Official UK PlayStation Magazine. The detailed and smooth graphics were of particular praise, and it had "an ideal mix of driving, crashing and career progression".

The same console version was a runner-up for GameSpots annual "Best Driving Game" award among console games, losing to Test Drive Le Mans.

Notes

References

External links 

2000 video games
Cancelled Windows games
Codemasters games
Game Boy Advance games
PlayStation (console) games
TOCA (series)
Video games set in Australia
Video games set in Japan
Video games set in the United Kingdom
Video games set in France
Video games set in Germany
Video games set in Italy
Video games set in Spain
Video games set in Austria
Video games set in Canada
Video games set in Wisconsin
Video games set in California
Video games set in Mexico
Video games set in Brazil
Video games set in Argentina
Video games developed in the United Kingdom